Sutter Avenue may refer to the following stations of the New York City Subway in Brooklyn:

Sutter Avenue–Rutland Road (IRT New Lots Line), serving the  trains
Sutter Avenue (BMT Canarsie Line), serving the  train